White tuna may refer to

 Albacore tuna, Thunnus alalunga – the pale-fleshed tuna favored by the canning industry, also known as shiro maguro, bin-naga maguro, or bincho maguro 
 Escolar, Lepidocybium flavobrunneum – a snake mackerel, which is often labeled as "white tuna"